Cozzi is an Italian surname. Notable people with the surname include:

Gaetano Cozzi (1922–2001), Italian historian
Ernesto Cozzi (1870–1926), Catholic missionary, diplomat, and ethnologist in Albania 
Ilario Cozzi (born 1979), Italian footballer
Julio Cozzi (1922–2011), Argentine footballer
Luigi Cozzi (born 1947), Italian film director
Paolo Cozzi (born 1980), Italian volleyball player
Vincenzo Cozzi (1926–2013), Italian Roman Catholic bishop

Italian-language surnames